Kim Renard Nazel (born June 17, 1965), better known by his stage names Arabian Prince or Professor X, is an American rapper, singer, songwriter, record producer, and DJ. He is best known as a founding member of N.W.A.

Early life
Nazel was born in Compton, California to the son of Joseph "Skippy" Nazel Jr., a prominent African-American author and radio talk show host.  His musical background came from his mother, a piano teacher and classical musician. His family tried its best to shelter him, sending him to a Catholic school and keeping him busy with football to keep him away from the gangs. The younger Nazel got his first experience with making music at the radio station his father hosted his talk show on; Nazel used the radio station's equipment to put together mixtapes that he would sell at school.  Nazel went on to graduate from Junípero Serra High School in nearby Gardena.

Music career
Nazel took the stage name of DJ Prince and started selling mixtapes at school. While working at a luggage store at the Del Amo Mall, its owner, Sam Nassif, asked him to DJ a party at a community center. He kept performing there for several weekends and the success persuaded Nassif to invest even more in the place, renaming it "The Cave", where Nazel would continue to host for over three years and even after his N.W.A. days. Nassif also funded DJ Prince's first record, "Strange Life".

He changed his stage name when he was 15 years old at the Skateland USA, the same skating venue credited for launching the NWA a few years later, due to a fan's suggestion. He said about his name:

Arabian Prince started working with Bobby Jimmy & the Critters in 1984. He also produced the hit single and album for J.J. Fad, "Supersonic".

In 1986, he was a founding member of N.W.A, but soon after fellow member Ice Cube came back from the Phoenix Institute of Technology in 1988, Arabian Prince left over royalty and contract disagreements. "I started off as a solo artist", he said, "so I was aware of what a royalty statement was. I knew that when these many records were sold, there is a quarterly statement. When you look at it, you can see how much money was paid and then share it. This was not the case. We were also never paid for touring." Eazy-E, Ice Cube and MC Ren remained as the main performers, DJ Yella was the turntablist and Dr. Dre was the main producer.

After leaving N.W.A, Arabian Prince began a solo career. His first album, Brother Arab, was released in 1989 with the single "She's Got A Big Posse"; Where's My Bytches followed in 1993.

In the mid-2000s, he started releasing music again, with his Professor X project on the Dutch label Clone Records. "I could not release the record under Arabian Prince", he said, "because I already had a single out, so I called myself Professor X on that record." In 2007, he performed as a DJ on the 2K Sports Holiday Bounce Tour with artists from the Stones Throw label. In 2008, Stones Throw released a compilation of his electro-rap material from the 1980s. One of his songs was included on the 2007 video game, College Hoops 2K8.

In 2015, a biopic about N.W.A. titled Straight Outta Compton was released; however, Arabian Prince was not portrayed in the film, and his role was omitted completely. The following year, N.W.A. was inducted into the Rock and Roll Hall of Fame, but again, Arabian Prince was not included nor mentioned.

In 2018, Arabian Prince appeared on the AmeriKKKant album of industrial-metal band Ministry. He made a second appearance on Ministry's 2021 album Moral Hygiene.

Other ventures
Aside from his music career, he worked in special effects, 3D animation and video games.

Straight Outta Compton movie controversy
After the release of the NWA film, Straight Outta Compton, in 2015, Arabian Prince said to VladTV: "A lot of the scenes in real life, I was there -I'm just not there in the film, which I'm like, if you're gonna write me out of a movie, shoot some other scenes. Don't write scenes where I was there."   Some of the pivotal scenes would be choosing the name for the band, the tour and the infamous Detroit concert. He also remembers himself as the main opposer to Jerry Heller about the royalties and the money, a role that in the movie was instead given to Ice Cube.

Discography

Solo
Strange Life (1984) Rapsur Records
Brother Arab (1989) Orpheus Records
Where's My Bytches (1993) Da Bozak Records

Compilations
Situation Hot (1990) Macola Records
Innovative Life: The Anthology, 1984–1989 (2008) Stones Throw Records
Professor X (2007/2008) Clone Records

With N.W.A
"Panic Zone" (Single) (1987)
N.W.A. and the Posse (1987)
Straight Outta Compton  (1988)

References

External links
Interview with Arabian Prince & Biography on westcoastpioneers
August 2008 Interview with L.A. Record
Arabian Prince RBMA lecture
Arabian Prince: What Happened After N.W.A. and the Posse? at Phoenix New Times
DJ Arabian Prince Interview NAMM Oral History Library (2020)

1964 births
Living people
African-American male rappers
Musicians from Compton, California
N.W.A members
Ruthless Records artists
20th-century American rappers
21st-century American rappers
American hip hop singers
African-American male singer-songwriters
20th-century African-American male singers
21st-century African-American male singers
Singer-songwriters from California